Loretta Gregorini (born 1948) is an Italian astronomer, active in the fields of radioastronomy and observational cosmology. Minor planet 34004 Gregorini was named after her.

References

20th-century Italian astronomers
21st-century Italian women scientists
Women astronomers
1948 births
Living people
21st-century Italian astronomers
20th-century Italian women scientists